Peng Tsu Ying (died 24 October 2018) was a pioneer deaf educator in Singapore. Peng died of heart failure due to old age on 24 October 2018, aged 92.

Personal life

References

2018 deaths
Educators of the deaf